The South African Journal of Science is an open access, multidisciplinary academic journal published bimonthly by the Academy of Science of South Africa. The journal has a 2021 impact factor of 2.134.

History
The journal was established in 1903 as the Proceedings of the Annual Meetings of the South African Association for the Advancement of Science. The annual volume became a monthly publication in August 1947.

Abstracting and indexing

The journal is abstracted and indexed in:

Scopus

Science Citation Index Expanded

Current Contents/Agriculture, Biology & Environmental Sciences

Current Contents/Life Sciences

The Zoological Record

BIOSIS Previews

References

External links

Multidisciplinary academic journals
Publications established in 1903
Monthly journals
Creative Commons Attribution-licensed journals
English-language journals
1903 establishments in the British Empire
Academic journals published in South Africa